This is a list of notable 3D printed weapons and parts. The table below lists noteworthy 3D printed weapons (mainly firearms) and parts of weapons as well as items with a defense-related background. It includes 3D printed weapons and parts created using plastic producing printers as well as metal producing printers.

The Liberator .380 was the first 3D printed plastic gun. It was a single shot pistol made using a Stratasys Dimension SST 3-D printer.

The Solid Concepts replica of the M1911 pistol was the first 3D printed metal gun, created using more than 38 printed parts; It has successfully fired more than 5000 rounds without damaging the gun.

List of weapons and parts 

 Key/Legend

Glossary of acronyms 
 FFF
 Fused Filament Fabrication, a process that squeezes a molten filament.
 FDM
 Fused deposition modeling, a trademarked term for FFF.
 DMLS
 Direct metal laser sintering, a process that fuses metal powder by sintering.
 SLM
 Selective laser melting, a process that fuses metal powder by melting.
 ABS
 Acrylonitrile butadiene styrene, a common thermoplastic with relatively high heat resistance.
ABSplus is a stronger, proprietary blend of ABS by Stratasys.
 PLA
 Polylactic acid, a bio-plastic. Easier to print, stiffer, and more brittle than other plastics.
PLA+ is a term for any blend that enhances some characteristic.
 PETG
 Polyethylene Terephthalate (glycol-modified), a plastic made by changing the chemicals used to synthesize the more common PET. Easier to print than ABS, and moderately better heat resistance than PLA.
 Often used in consumer-level printers when creators desire better heat resistance than PLA+ or need more flexibility.

See also 
 3D printing
 Defense Distributed
 Gun control
 Gun politics in the United States
 Improvised firearm

References 

Weapon development
Homemade firearms
3D printed